C.E. "Chris" Gatchalian (born June 5, 1974) is a Canadian author who writes in multiple genres. Born in Vancouver, British Columbia to Filipino parents, he holds an MFA in Creative Writing and Theatre from the University of British Columbia. His play Motifs & Repetitions aired on Bravo! (Canada) in 1997 and on the Knowledge in 1998. His other produced plays include Claire, Crossing, Broken and People Like Vince, a play for young audiences about mental health. His latest play, Falling in Time, had its world premiere in Vancouver in November 2011 and was published by Scirocco Drama in 2012. In 2013 he won the Dayne Ogilvie Prize, a prize presented by the Writers' Trust of Canada to an openly LGBT writer. In 2019 his memoir Double Melancholy: Art, Beauty, and the Making of a Brown Queer Man was published by Arsenal Pulp Press.

Personal life
He is openly gay, and is a three-time finalist for the Lambda Literary Award, including in 2013 for Falling in Time.

Plays
Motifs & Repetitions (1995)
Claire (1999)
Crossing (2004)
Star (2005)
Hands (2005)
Broken (2006)
People Like Vince (2011)
Falling in Time (2012)

Non-fiction
Double Melancholy: Art, Beauty, and the Making of a Brown Queer Man (2019)

Poetry
tor/sion (2005)

References

External links
 C. E. Gatchalian

20th-century Canadian dramatists and playwrights
Writers from Vancouver
1974 births
Living people
Canadian gay writers
Canadian people of Filipino descent
Canadian LGBT dramatists and playwrights
Canadian writers of Asian descent
21st-century Canadian dramatists and playwrights
Canadian male dramatists and playwrights
University of British Columbia alumni
20th-century Canadian male writers
21st-century Canadian male writers
21st-century Canadian LGBT people
Gay dramatists and playwrights